Sahara Khatun (1 March 1943 – 9 July 2020) was a Bangladesh Awami League politician and a cabinet minister. She was the incumbent Jatiyo Sangsad member representing the Dhaka-18 constituency, and was the presidium member of the party.

Early life
Khatun was born in Kurmitola in Dhaka on 1 March 1943 to Abdul Aziz and Turjan Nesa. She completed BA and LLB degrees. She was the presidium member of Bangladesh Awami League, founding president of Bangladesh Awami Ainjibi Parishad and general secretary of Bangladesh Mahila Samity, as well as a member of the International Women Lawyers' Association and the International Women's Alliance. She started her career as a lawyer, and rose to fight cases at the Supreme Court of Bangladesh.

Political career

Khatun was involved in politics since her student life. She entered the national political scene in 1991 when she contested  the 5th Parliamentary elections as an Awami League candidate, and was defeated by Khaleda Zia of BNP, who then went on to become the Prime Minister of Bangladesh.

Khatun came in the scene again upon the arrest of current Prime Minister Sheikh Hasina. Khatun was one of the forerunners to induce a legal as well as a political battle in Hasina's favour. Khatun herself was charged with politically motivated crimes during the Caretaker Government's regime.

With the exposure received in the run-up to the 2008 Bangladesh general election, Khatun was pitched as an Awami League candidate from the Dhaka-18 constituency. She eventually won the election, and was then appointed as the minister of home affairs of the government of Bangladesh. She took office on 6 January 2009. In a cabinet reshuffle of 2012, she was relieved of her duties as the Home Minister and made the Minister of Posts and Telecommunications.

Tenure as minister

Khatun's tenure as minister of home affairs has been marred by the following controversies.

BDR mutiny 

During the 2009 BDR Mutiny, Khatun led the delegation to negotiate with the mutineers, who were soldiers staging a mutiny against their officers of Bangladesh Rifles, the paramilitary force in charge of the borders. She went inside the campus of Bangladesh Rifles to stimulate negotiation and to ask the mutineers to put their arms down.

The mutiny resulted in the death of 53 top officials of the army, and 3 family members.

Extrajudicial killing 

Awami League in 2008 had promised in its election manifesto that it would stop all extrajudicial killings if brought to power, and Human Rights Watch observed that Awami League had failed in its promise.

Comment on Janmastami 
Khatun attracted criticism in August 2010 when she asked the Hindu-minorities to cut their religious festival Janmastami short, so that it wouldn't clash with the Muslim-majority observances of Ramadan, as they coincided with the same time period. She urged the Hindu community not to make loud noises during sunset, when Muslims would be having iftar. Her comments were considered discriminatory, since a limitation on minority celebrations was being imposed for the first time; Hindu festivals had previously coincided with Ramadan in Bangladesh.

Death 
Khatun died on 9 July 2020 at the Bumrungrad International Hospital in Bangkok, Thailand, due to COVID-19.

References 

1943 births
2020 deaths
People from Dhaka
Awami League politicians
Women government ministers of Bangladesh
Women members of the Jatiya Sangsad
21st-century Bangladeshi women politicians
Female interior ministers
Posts, Telecommunications and Information Technology ministers
Home Affairs ministers of Bangladesh
9th Jatiya Sangsad members
10th Jatiya Sangsad members
11th Jatiya Sangsad members
Former parliament members from Dhaka-18
Deaths from the COVID-19 pandemic in Thailand